Once in a Million is a 1936 British comedy film directed by Arthur B. Woods and starring Charles 'Buddy' Rogers, Mary Brian and Jimmy Godden. It was shot at the Welwyn Studios of British International Pictures near London.  The film's sets were designed by the art director Cedric Dawe.

Synopsis
The screenplay concerns a bank clerk who is left to guard a million pounds and fantasises about how he would spend the money.

Cast
 Charles "Buddy" Rogers as Pierre
 Mary Brian as Suzanne
 W.H. Berry as Gallivert
 Haver and Lee as Joe and Chief
 Norah Gale as  Princess
 Billy Milton as Prince
 Charles Carson asPresident
 Nadine March as Josette
 Iris Hoey as Mrs. Fenwick
 Veronica Rose as Caroline
 Jimmy Godden as Plume

References

Bibliography
Wood, Linda. British Films, 1927–1939. British Film Institute, 1986.

External links

1936 films
1936 comedy films
1930s English-language films
Films directed by Arthur B. Woods
British comedy films
British black-and-white films
1930s British films
Films shot at Welwyn Studios